194 authorized licensed medical marijuana producers have been approved by Health Canada. Including: 
 Aurora Cannabis
 Aphria
 CanniMed
 Canopy Growth Corporation
 Organigram
 Tantalus Labs
 The Green Organic Dutchman
 Tilray
 VIVO Cannabis
 Zenabis

References

External links
Health Canada Website
License Producers Canada

Licensed producers of medical marijuana in Canada
Licensed producers of medical marijuana in Canada